The Marshal of the Sejm , also known as Sejm Marshal, Chairman of the Sejm or Speaker of the Sejm is the speaker (chair) of the Sejm, the lower house of the Polish Parliament. The office traces its origins to the 15th century. In modern Poland, the full title is Marshal of the Sejm of the Republic of Poland.

Related historical offices
The Polish–Lithuanian Commonwealth also had an office of Sejmik Marshal.

In the Kingdom of Galicia and Lodomeria, from 1861, the chairman of the Provincial Sejm of Galicia with its seat at Lwów bore the title Marszałek krajowy (Province Marshal). The Kingdom of Poland, from 1916 to 1918, used the title Marszałek Rady Stanu (Marshal of the State Council).

In the Second Polish Republic (1918–1939), the deputies  elected one of their number as Marshal of the Sejm for the duration of the Sejm's term. Until 1935 (when superseded by the Senate Marshal), the Marshal or Chairman of the Sejm substituted for the President of Poland in the latter's absence or disability (Acting President of the Republic of Poland).

Modern Marshals of the Sejm
Today the Marshal of the Sejm is the chairman of the Presidium of the Sejm (Prezydium Sejmu) and the Convention of Seniors (Konwent Seniorów). The Marshal oversees the work of the Sejm, supervises procedural sessions of the Sejm, and convenes and chairs the proceedings of the Convention of Seniors and the Presidium of the Sejm. He (or she) appoints the Chief of the Chambers (of the Sejm, and of the Senat), and since 1989 substitutes for the President of Poland in the event of that office's vacancy.

His/her deputy is the Deputy Marshal of the Sejm of the Republic of Poland. This would be an elected representative rather than a fixed individual.

List

See also
 Senior Marshal
 Offices in the Polish-Lithuanian Commonwealth

Polish titles
Government occupations
 
Poland